FK Žitorađa is a football club based in Žitorađa, Serbia. They currently compete in the Zone League South, the fourth tier of the national league system.

History
The club made its Second League of FR Yugoslavia debut in 2000. They spent three seasons in the second tier, before being relegated to the Serbian League East in 2003.

Honours
Niš Zone League (Tier 4)
 2009–10

Seasons

References

External links
 Club page at Srbijasport

1957 establishments in Serbia
Association football clubs established in 1957
Football clubs in Serbia